Fabio Baldas (born 19 March 1949 in Trieste) is a former association football referee from Italy. He is mostly known for supervising one match in the 1994 FIFA World Cup in the United States, the first-round Group A contest between the United States and Colombia.

Baldas served as a referee in numerous international competitions, including the 1991 FIFA U-17 World Championship and the 1992 Olympic tournament. He also officiated in 1994 World Cup qualifiers.

References

External links
 Fabio Baldas at WorldFootball.net

1949 births
Italian football referees
FIFA World Cup referees
Living people
1994 FIFA World Cup referees